Gmogala is a monotypic genus of South Pacific comb-footed spiders containing the single species, Gmogala scarabaeus. It was first described by Eugen von Keyserling in 1890, and is found in Australia and Papua New Guinea.

See also
 List of Theridiidae species

References

Monotypic Araneomorphae genera
Spiders of Australia
Spiders of Oceania
Taxa named by Eugen von Keyserling
Theridiidae